Mesodma is an extinct genus of mammal, a member of the extinct order Multituberculata within the suborder Cimolodonta, family Neoplagiaulacidae. It lived during the upper Cretaceous and Paleocene Periods of what is now North America. The earliest definitive record is from the late Santonian stage strata of the Straight Cliffs Formation. A single premolar tooth from the lower Cenomanian stage strata of the Cedar Mountain Formation has been tentatively assigned to this genus based on its similarity, but its describers noted that it is unlikely that Mesodma lived during that time.

Species
Mesodma ambigua
Place: Mantua Lentil, Wyoming (USA)
Age: Maastrichtian-Puercan, Upper Cretaceous - Paleocene
Weight: about 55 g
Mesodma formosa
Place: Hell Creek and Frenchman Formation, USA & Canada.  This species is possibly also known from Utah.
Age: Maastrichtian-Puercan (Upper Cretaceous to the Paleocene).  
Weight: about 30 g
Mesodma hensleighi
Place: Hell Creek Formation in the U.S. and in Saskatchewan, Canada. 
Age: Campanian (Upper Cretaceous).  
Weight: around 15 g
Mesodma pygmaea
Place: Gidley Quarry, Montana, as well as Wyoming and Alberta, Canada
Age: Torrejonian-Tiffanian (Middle Paleocene). 
Weight: about 8 g
Mesodma senecta
Age: Campanian (Upper Cretaceous)
Weight: about 50 g
Mesodma thompsoni (=M. garfieldensis)
Place: St Mary River Formation & Montana and Wyoming of the US and Canada
Age: Maastrichtian-Puercan, Upper Cretaceous - Paleocene
Weight: about 55 g

The species "Mesodma" primaeva from the Judithian of Western Interior of North America was formerly assigned to the genus Mesodma, but subsequently it was made the type species of a separate genus Filikomys.

References

Further reading 
Osborn (1891); "A review of the Cretaceous Mammalia". Proc. Acad. Nat. Sci. Phila. 124 - 135.
Simpson (1929), "American Mesozoic Mammalia". Mem. Peabody Mus. Nat. Hist. iii (i): p. 1-235.
Clemens (1963), "Fossil mammals of the type Lance formation Wyoming. Part I. Introduction and Multituberculata". Univ. Calif. Pub;. Geol. Sci. 48, p. 1-105. (According to Peabody Museum database.)
Marsh (1889), "Discovery of Cretaceous Mammalia". Am. J. Sci. (3) xxxviii, p. 177-180.
Archibald (1982), A study of Mammalia and geology across the Cretaceous-Tertiary boundary in Garfield County, Montana. Univ. of Calif. Publ. Geol. Sci. 122xvi+, 286pp.
Jepsen (1940), "Paleocene faunas of the Polecat Bench formation, Park County, Wyoming". Pro. Amer. Philos. Soc 83, p. 217-341, 21 figs., 5 pls.

Ptilodontoids
Paleocene genus extinctions
Cretaceous mammals of North America
Paleocene mammals of North America
Ojo Alamo Formation
Milk River Formation
Hell Creek fauna
Prehistoric mammal genera